Puerto Pilón is a corregimiento in Colón District, Colón Province, Panama with a population of 16,517 as of 2010. Its population as of 1990 was 10,241; its population as of 2000 was 11,658.

References

Populated places in Colón Province
Corregimientos of Colón Province